St. Josaphat Cathedral may refer to:

Canada
St. Josaphat Cathedral, Edmonton, Alberta

United States
St. Josaphat's Ukrainian Catholic Cathedral (Parma, Ohio)